Jessie Farrell is a Canadian country music singer. At the 2007 Canadian Country Music Awards, Farrell was nominated for Female Vocalist of the Year and the Chevy Rising Star Award. Farrell's first country album, Nothing Fancy, was released on October 9, 2007. At the Canadian Country Music Awards of 2008, Jessie Farrell won Female Artist of the Year and the Top New Female Talent Award. In 2009, she worked with Canadian rock/pop stars Faber Drive on their song "I'll Be There".

Farrell's third studio album, Good, Bad & Pretty Things, was released on October 6, 2009. In 2010, Farrell was one of many Canadian singers who performed "Wavin' Flag" to help Haiti.

Farrell's fourth studio album, Love Letter, was released on August 30, 2011, led by the single "Turn You Down."

In January 2015 Farrell released her first family album, Take Me Outside. The songs are featured on the popular CBC Kid's show, Scout & The Gumboot Kids.

Discography

Studio albums

Singles

Featured singles

Music videos

Awards and nominations

References

External links

Official Site
604 Records

Canadian women country singers
Canadian country singer-songwriters
Living people
Musicians from Vancouver
Year of birth missing (living people)
Canadian Country Music Association Female Artist of the Year winners
21st-century Canadian women singers